Vega High School is a public high school located in Vega, Texas and classified as a 2A school by the UIL. It is part of the Vega Independent School District located in southeastern Oldham County.

Athletics
The Vega Longhorns compete in the following sports 

Basketball
Cross Country
Football
Golf
Powerlifting
Tennis
Track and Field
Volleyball

Team State Titles
Boys Basketball - 
1979(1A)
Girls Basketball - 
1999(1A)

Individual State Titles

Academics

Individual State Titles 

 Accounting 
 2022
 2021
 Computer Applications 
 2022
 2019
 Headline Writing 
 2022
 Prose Interpretation 
 1992
 Science-Chemistry 
 2002
 1993

Team State Titles 

 Accounting 
 2022
 2019
 Science 
 2004
 2002
 1997

AG Mechanics/FFA 
The Vega FFA operates as a chapter of the Future Farmers of America. The Ag department focuses heavily on building Agricultural Mechanics projects and shows at different shows across Texas.

FCCLA

NHS 
Vega High School operates a chapter of the National Honor Society

Student Council 
Vega High School operates a chapter of the Texas Association of Student Councils

Band 
The Heartbeat of the Horns marching and concert band serves as the schools only musical arts extracurricular.

VHS Fight Song

Go Longhorns Go

We're going on to football fame

Fight Longhorns Fight

We're gonna fight to win this game

Win Longhorns Win

We're gonna know that score is right

Fight, with all your might

We're gonna win this game tonight

V-H-S

GO-FIGHT-WIN

VHS ALMA MATER

Our strong bond shall ne'er be broken, it shall never die.

Far surpassing wealth unspoken, sealed by friendship nigh.

Lift the chorus ever onward, Black and Gold tonight.

Hail to thee our Alma Mater, HAIL TO VEGA HIGH.

References

External links
Vega ISD

Schools in Oldham County, Texas
Public high schools in Texas
Public middle schools in Texas